Arbutamine is a cardiac stimulant. It stimulates β adrenergic receptors.

References 

Beta-adrenergic agonists
Catecholamines
Cardiac stimulants
Phenylethanolamines